Renealmia alpinia is a flowering plant species native to the Americas, where it grows from southern Mexico through much of South America, though not in the Southern Cone. It can also be found on several Caribbean islands.

In Quechua it is called misk'i p'anqa (misk'i sweet; honey, p'anqa bract, "sweet bract" or "honey bract"). The name alludes to R. alpinias value as a culinary herb, especially for flavoring fish. Among Spanish-speakers this species is known as jenjibre-de-jardin ("garden ginger"). Both jenjibre-de-jardin and ginger (Zingiber officinale) are in the family Zingiberaceae.

Renealmia alpinia is commonly known as mardi gras in Trinidad, where hunters administer it either orally or topically to their hunting dogs to treat a variety of conditions, from sprains to snakebite.

In Suriname it's known as masoesa'''.

Biochemistry
Zhou et al. (1997) of the Virginia Polytechnic Institute and State University identified three diterpenes produced by R. alpinia: 11-hydroxy-8(17),12(E)-labdadien-15,-16-dial 11,15-hemiacetal (1) and 16-oxo-8(17),12(E)-labdadien-15-oic acid (2), which are labdane diterpenes, and 8(17),12(E)-labdadien-15,16-dial (3). The team performed these assays on the basis of reports that R. alpinia may be antipyretic (fever-reducing).

Biogeography
In Mexico, wild R. alpinia'' populations have been found in the southern states of Chiapas, Oaxaca, and Veracruz. It also grows on the Caribbean islands of Dominica, Grenada, Guadeloupe, Martinique, Montserrat, Puerto Rico, St. Kitts, Nevis, Trinidad, and Tobago.

In Central America, it grows in Belize, Costa Rica, Guatemala, Honduras, and Panama.

In South America, it is found in Brazil, Colombia, Ecuador, French Guiana, Guyana, Peru, Suriname, and Venezuela.

References

External links

Renealmia alpinia at Discover Life. Retrieved 24 June 2013.

alpinia
Flora of the Amazon
Flora of Brazil
Flora of Colombia
Flora of Costa Rica
Flora of Ecuador
Flora of French Guiana
Flora of Grenada
Flora of Guadeloupe
Flora of Guatemala
Flora of Guyana
Flora of Honduras
Flora of Martinique
Flora of Mexico
Flora of Montserrat
Flora of Panama
Flora of Peru
Flora of Puerto Rico
Flora of Saint Kitts and Nevis
Flora of Suriname
Flora of Trinidad and Tobago
Flora of Venezuela
Medicinal plants of South America
Plants described in 1775
Flora without expected TNC conservation status